Kakol is one of the 51 union councils of Abbottabad District in Khyber-Pakhtunkhwa province of Pakistan. According to the 2017 Census of Pakistan, the population is 14,924.

Subdivisions
 Balolia
 Kakol
 Mandroch Kalan
 Mandroch Khurd

References

Union councils of Abbottabad District